The Girl from Mandalay is a 1936 American action film directed by Howard Bretherton and written by Wellyn Totman and Endre Bohem. It is based on the 1931 novel Tiger Valley by Reginald Campbell. The film stars Conrad Nagel, Kay Linaker, Donald Cook, Esther Ralston, Harry Stubbs and Reginald Barlow. The film was released on April 20, 1936, by Republic Pictures.

Plot

Cast 
Conrad Nagel as John Foster
Kay Linaker as Jeanie Barton Foster
Donald Cook as Kenneth Grainger
Esther Ralston as Mary Trevor
Harry Stubbs as Herbert Trevor
Reginald Barlow as Dr. Collins
George Regas as Headman
David Clyde as Malone
Harry Allen as Ship Captain

References

External links
 

1936 films
American action films
1930s action films
Republic Pictures films
Films directed by Howard Bretherton
American black-and-white films
Films produced by Nat Levine
1930s English-language films
1930s American films